Primary Colors may refer to:

 Primary color, sets of colors that can be combined to make a useful range of colors

Books and films
 Primary Colors (novel), a 1996 novel by Joe Klein
 Primary Colors (film), a 1998 film based on the novel

Music
 Primary Colors (album), by Day After Tomorrow (2004) 
 Primary Colours (The Horrors album) (2009)
 Primary Colours (Eddy Current Suppression Ring album) (2008) 
 Primary Colors (soundtrack) music by Ry Cooder
 Primary Colours (Magic! album), a 2016 album by MAGIC!
 "Primary Colours", song by The Horrors from the album Primary Colors and the B-side of the single "Whole New Way"